Nagaland Public Service Commission, abbreviated as NPSC is a constitutional body established in 1965 by the Government of Nagaland. It is responsible for conducting Civil Services examinations and Competitive Examinations to select the eligible candidates for various  civil services and departmental posts.

History 
Formation of NPSC came into consideration in 1965 when Nagaland state was born under the constitution of India. The commission was initially headed by its chairman along with its two members. In 1985, the commission was granted the permission to work under two more members.

Functions and responsibilities
The commission is performing various roles as amended in Article 320 of the Constitution of India.
To conduct competitive and civil examinations for appointments to the services under its jurisdiction.
 To conducting screening test of the selected candidates.
To sought assistance from the Union Public Service Commission in framing, or operating schemes if needed or requested by the state commission.
To make appointments to state civil services.
To check the suitability of the candidates when promoting and transferring them from one service to another.

Administrative Setup
NPSC was primarily headed by three members including one chairman. Since the past amendments were revised, now it consists four members and a chairman.

See also

 List of Public service commissions in India

References 

Government of Nagaland
Government agencies established in 1965
1965 establishments in Nagaland